Siddharthanagar, formerly and colloquially still called Bhairahawa, is a municipality and the administrative headquarter of Rupandehi District in Lumbini Province of Nepal,  west of Nepal's capital Kathmandu. The city borders the Indian city of Sonauli in Maharajganj district of Uttar Pradesh. 

Although the current name was first used in 1977, many still refer to it as Bhairahawa.

History and etymology
The city was founded as Bhairahawa in 1967.  The city's current name Siddharthanagar derives from Buddha's given name Siddhartha, as the birthplace of Buddha is located only  to the west. The name was changed to Siddhartanagar in 1977 by poet Komal Dutta Tiwari.

Climate

Demographics
The population of Siddarthanagar in 2001 was 63,528. According to the 2011 census it was

Education 

Rupandehi Lilaram Ma Vi, Bhairahawa Ma Vi, Paklihawa Ma Vi are old higher secondary schools.
There are several higher education facilities in Siddharthanagar including Rupandehi Campus, IAAS Paklihawa Campus, Universal College of Medical Sciences and Bhairahawa Namuna Campus.

See also
Butwal

References

https://siddharthanagarmun.gov.np/

Populated places in Rupandehi District
Transit and customs posts along the India–Nepal border
Points for exit and entry of nationals from third countries along the India–Nepal border
Nepal municipalities established in 1967